Prunus leveilleana is a native of Korea and Japan. It generally has autumnal leaves of reddish-brown or crimson red colour. It has flowers of bright yellow-white colors.

Biochemistry

In this species various new flavonoid compounds have been found. The compounds are pinocembrin-5-glucoside (5,7-dihydroxyflavanone 5-glucoside), geinstein (5,7,4'-trihydroxysoflavone), prunetin (5,4' dihydroxy-7-methoxyflavanone) and pinocembrin (5,7-dihydroxyflavanone) were found on September 6, 1956.

Habitat

This species is a native of middle Japan, where it is commonly distributed into the mountainous regions.

References

leveilleana
Cherries
Cherry blossom